The Mysterious Mr. Tiller is a 1917 American silent mystery drama film directed by Rupert Julian and starring Ruth Clifford, Rupert Julian and Frank Brownlee.

Cast
 Ruth Clifford as Clara Hawthorne
 Rupert Julian as Prentice Tiller
 Frank Brownlee as Ramon Mordant
 Wedgwood Nowell as Stephen Pitt
 Harry L. Rattenberry as O'Meara 
 E. Alyn Warren as Rosario 
 Lloyd Whitlock as Banning
 William Higby as Chief Detective

References

Bibliography
 Robert B. Connelly. The Silents: Silent Feature Films, 1910-36, Volume 40, Issue 2. December Press, 1998.

External links
 

1917 films
1917 drama films
1910s English-language films
American silent feature films
Silent American drama films
American black-and-white films
Universal Pictures films
Films directed by Rupert Julian
1910s American films